Clifton Leaf is an American journalist and was the editor-in-chief of Fortune magazine from March 2017 to July 2021. He graduated from Williams College.

Awards

 2005 Gerald Loeb Award for business journalism in Magazines

References

American magazine editors
American reporters and correspondents
Williams College alumni
Living people
Fortune (magazine) people
American male journalists
Year of birth missing (living people)
Gerald Loeb Award winners for Magazines